Shailendra Gaur is an Indian actor known for portraying Indian revolutionary Vinayak Damodar Savarkar in the biopic film Veer Savarkar (2001) directed by Ved Rahi.

Shailendra Gaur lives in Mumbai. He received a Ph.D. in Hindi literature. After his education, he came to Delhi. Shailendra started his acting career as a theatre actor in Delhi with theatre director Arvind Gaur and Panchchnan Pathak ..Later he got trained from eminent theatre Guru Ebrahim Alkazi's "Living Theatre".. In Living Theatre, Shailendra acted in many stage plays directed by Ebrahim Alkazi.

References 

Indian male film actors
Year of birth missing (living people)
Living people